Solibacillus kalamii is a Gram-positive, rod-shaped, endospore-forming and aerobic bacterium from the genus of Solibacillus which has been isolated from a high-efficiency particulate arrestance filter system from the International Space Station.

Discovery 
The bacteria was found in the high-efficiency particulate arrestance filter or HEPA filter, which is the routine housekeeping and cleaning system on board the International Space Station. The filter on which the new bug was found remained on board the ISS for 40 months. This filter was later analysed at  the Jet Propulsion Laboratory (JPL), the foremost lab of NASA for work on interplanetary travel, in 2017. The discovery was published by Dr. Kasthuri Venkateswaran, senior research scientist, Biotechnology and Planetary Protection Group, in the International Journal of Systematic and Evolutionary Microbiology.

The new bacteria was named after the late President of India, Dr. A.P.J. Abdul Kalam, who was a renowned aerospace scientist and had his early training at NASA in 1963.

Characteristics 
They tend to withstand high radiation and also produce some useful compounds protein-wise which will be helpful for biotechnology applications. Researchers have not characterised the bacteria fully but they are of the view that the new bug could be a key source for chemicals that can help protect against radiation damage.

References

External links
Type strain of Solibacillus kalamii at BacDive -  the Bacterial Diversity Metadatabase

Bacillales
Bacteria described in 2017